The Head Office building of The Bank of New South Wales was designed by prolific Melbourne architect Joseph Reed and constructed at 368-374 Collins St, Melbourne, in 1856-7. Reed was awarded first prize, worth £75, in the Bank of New South Wales’ competition to design their new Melbourne headquarters on a vacant block of land facing the prominent Criterion Hotel. Reed's design was chosen for its extensive use of ornamentation on the relatively small scale building. The façade of the Bank of New South Wales building is prized as a leading example of mid nineteenth century Renaissance Revival architecture in Melbourne. Structural shortcomings and the desire for expansion led to the building's demolition in 1932. Reed's original National Trust heritage-listed façade was preserved and gifted to the University of Melbourne, where it can still be seen on the western face of the Melbourne School of Design, opposite Union Lawn.

Description 

The intricate, dual-level façade is in the Renaissance Revival style. The lower level of the façade consists of capped columns in the Ionic order with fluted scamozzi capitals. These lower columns sit upon carved stone pedestals held in place by rusticated blue-stone plinths. On the upper level of the façade fluted Corinthian columns are crowned with an ornate entablature. The upper frieze is decorated with nude figures holding flowers and fruits, while the lower half contains ornamented wreaths carved in place by sculptor Charles Summers.

 Both levels of the façade consist of five vertical bays. At street level two of these bays contain the tall timber entrance doors. The left entrance originally led directly to the main banking hall, while the right entrance led to the manager's private residence. Three center window bays are recessed behind the classical columns. Balustrading in front of each window creates balconies and provides privacy to the reception rooms within.

Key influences and design approach 

Joseph Reed believed that the style of a building should match its function, and though his designs were rarely directly informed by existing buildings, his Bank of New South Wales building is a copy of Jacopo Sansovino’s Biblioteca Marciana in St Mark’s Square in Venice. Reed chose Sansovino’s library due to the building’s style and evocation of merchant activity and the function of banking that was central to the city and society in Renaissance Italy.

Demolition 

Internal structural problems were discovered as early as 1861, just four years after initial construction was completed. In 1885 architect William Salway of Reed & Barnes was commissioned to undertake extensive restoration of the building. Eventually, the continuing decay of both the interior and façade coupled with the need to expand culminated in the final decision to demolish the building in 1932 to make way for a newer, larger Art Deco design.

When Reed was questioned about the structural integrity of the building he responded, “At the time there was no iron to be had in the colony. Some stone arches and columns were removed by order of the management, and timber substituted; dry rot got into it, and the thing failed".

In 1933 Architects Godfrey and Spowers were chosen to design the new premises for the Bank of New South Wales to be built on the same plot at 368-374 Collins St. The art deco design was completed in 1936 and won the Street Architecture Gold Medal in the same year.

Reed's original classical façade was preserved before demolition and gifted by the Bank of New South Wales to the University of Melbourne, and erected on university grounds in 1938. The structure can be seen today as the west facing façade of the school for Architecture, Building and Planning.

Notes

References 
 Dunstan, David (2010). Joseph Reed: A city’s greatest architect, in Australian Heritage, Autumn 2010.
 Goad, P.; Tibbits, G. (2003). Architecture on Campus. Melbourne University Press.
 Goad, P. (2004). 150 Years of Australian Architecture. Thames & Hudson.
 Lyall, P. (1856). The Argus. "The Architectural Profession". p79.
 Saunders, David. "Reed, Joseph (1823? - 1890)". Australian Dictionary of Biography Online. Australian National University.

External links 
 
 
 
 

Relocated buildings and structures
Commercial buildings completed in 1856
1856 establishments in Australia
Bank of New South Wales
Former bank buildings in Australia
Demolished buildings and structures in Melbourne
Buildings and structures demolished in 1932
Buildings and structures in the City of Melbourne (LGA)